The Buffelsfontein mine is a large mine located in the northern part of South Africa in Gauteng. Buffelsfontein represents one of the largest uranium reserves in South Africa having estimated reserves of 59.3 million tonnes of ore grading 0.016% uranium.

References 

Uranium mines in South Africa
Economy of Gauteng
Geography of Gauteng